Maynard Mountain is a  mountain summit located in the Chugach Mountains, in the U.S. state of Alaska. Nearby peaks include Bard Peak,  to the south, and Begich Peak,  to the west-northwest. Although modest in elevation, relief is significant since the eastern aspect of the mountain rises up from the tidewater of Prince William Sound's Passage Canal in approximately one mile. Maynard Mountain is often seen and photographed in the background behind Portage Lake, a popular tourist and recreation destination. The Anton Anderson Memorial Tunnel, often called the Whittier Tunnel, is a dual-use highway and railroad tunnel that passes through Maynard Mountain.

The mountain was named by Chief Warrant Officer Robert G. Warns, US Army, in commemoration of his friend Robert L. Maynard, a fellow Army helicopter pilot who was killed April 27, 1964, when his CH-21 helicopter crashed on the nearby Portage Glacier while aiding victims of the Good Friday earthquake. The flight was in support of operation "Helping Hand", transporting personnel and supplies from Anchorage to the Port of Whittier. The mountain's name was officially adopted November 9, 1965, by the United States Geological Survey.

Climate

Based on the Köppen climate classification, Maynard Mountain is located in a subarctic climate zone with long, cold, snowy winters, and mild summers. Weather systems coming off the Gulf of Alaska are forced upwards by the Chugach Mountains (orographic lift), causing heavy precipitation in the form of rainfall and snowfall. Temperatures can drop below −20 °C with wind chill factors below −30 °C. This climate supports permanent ice on the slopes of the mountain, as well as the Learnard Glacier on the northeast aspect. The months May through June offer the most favorable weather for climbing or viewing.

See also

List of mountain peaks of Alaska
Geography of Alaska

References

External links
 Maynard Mountain weather forecast
 Flickr photo: Maynard Mountain in winter

Mountains of Alaska
Kenai Mountains-Turnagain Arm National Heritage Area
North American 1000 m summits